Atomorpha is a genus of moths in the family Geometridae.

Species

 Atomorpha falsaria (Alphéraky, 1892)
 Atomorpha hedemanni (Christoph, 1885)
 Atomorpha marmorata (A. Bang-Haas, 1907)
 Atomorpha punctistrigaria (Christoph, 1893)

References
Atomorpha at Markku Savela's Lepidoptera and Some Other Life Forms

Gnophini
Geometridae genera